The Format is the sixth studio album by rapper AZ, released on November 7, 2006. The album features production from Fizzy Womack (better known as Lil' Fame of M.O.P.), Face Defeat, Emile, J. Cardim, Phonte, Statik Selektah and DJ Premier. Guest appearances are provided by M.O.P. and Little Brother as well as artists on AZ's new label, Quiet Money Records. The album's lead single is its title track, "The Format", produced by DJ Premier, with "Vendetta" as its B-side. The Format also features the bonus track "Royal Salute", a retaliation to 50 Cent's song "What If", which included a line aimed at AZ. On October 7, 2007, Quiet Money released The Format (Special Edition) adding six bonus tracks, including "Royal Salute."

Track listing

Sample credits

I Am The Truth
"I'm Talking 'Bout Freedom" by Syl Johnson
Sit 'Em Back Slow
"Mary Jane" by Rick James
Make Me
"Professional Style" by Alchemist Feat. AZ
Games
"Return of the Mack" by Mark Morrison
Rise and Fall
"Love's Society" by The Natural Four
Animal
"Ten Crack Commandments" by The Notorious B.I.G.
"Memory Lane (Sittin' in da Park)" by Nas
"Survival of the Fittest" by Mobb Deep

Doing That
"Money (Dollar Bill Y'all)" by Jimmy Spicer
"Hi Hater" by Maino
This Is What I Do
"Love's Calling" by Zingara
The Format
"This Side of Forever" by Roberta Flack
"Survival of the Fittest" by Mobb Deep
"Pt. 2" by Method Man & Redman
"What's the deal?" by AZ
"The Exorcist" by Little Vic
Game Of Life
"I Ain't Got To Love Nobody Else" by Carolyn Franklin (Prod. by Jimmy Radcliffe)
Royal Salute
"The Ruler's Back" by Slick Rick
"The Ruler's Back" by Jay-Z

Charts
dating

References

External links
 The Format at Discogs
 '' at Genius

2006 albums
Albums produced by DJ Premier
AZ (rapper) albums